Erke-Kashka is a village in Aravan District, Osh Region of Kyrgyzstan. Its population was 328 in 2021.

References

Populated places in Osh Region